Michelin House at 81 Fulham Road, Chelsea, London, was constructed as the first permanent UK headquarters and tyre depot for the Michelin Tyre Company Ltd.  The building opened for business on 20 January 1911. In 1987 the building was converted to mixed-use, with a store, restaurant, bar and office space.

Brief history

Designed by one of Michelin's employees, François Espinasse, the building has three large stained-glass windows based on Michelin advertisements of the time, all featuring the Michelin Man "Bibendum".  Around the front of the original building at street level there is a number of decorative tiles showing famous racing cars of the time that used Michelin tyres.  More tiles can be found inside the front of the building, which was originally a tyre-fitting bay for passing motorists.  People walking into the reception area of the building are still greeted by a mosaic on the floor showing Bibendum holding aloft a glass of nuts, bolts and other hazards, proclaiming "Nunc Est Bibendum" (Latin for "Now is the time to drink").  The reception area also features more decorative tiles around its walls.  Two glass cupolas, which look like piles of tyres, frame either side of the front of the building. The Michelin company's close association with road maps and tourism is represented by a number of etchings of the streets of Paris on some of the first-floor windows.

Michelin moved out of the building in 1985, when it was purchased by publisher Paul Hamlyn and the restaurateur/retailer Sir Terence Conran, who shared a love for the building. They embarked on a major redevelopment that included the restoration of some the original features.  The new development also featured offices for Hamlyn's company Octopus Publishing, as well as Conran's Bibendum Restaurant & Oyster Bar, and a Conran Shop. All three businesses opened in August 1987.

Design and construction

Patents owned by Dunlop prevented other manufacturers from selling their tyres in Britain, except under licence.  The patents were due to expire in the autumn of 1904, and in anticipation of this, Michelin opened an office in Tavistock Place, South Kensington.  Michelin sent four employees over from France to Britain to establish the new British branch of the company.  Fourteen local staff were also recruited.  In June 1905, the Michelin Tyre Company Limited was incorporated.  Within a year, the staff had increased to over forty and the company moved into new premises in Sussex Place.  When it soon became apparent that the company needed much larger premises, the search for a new site began.  A number of different sites were looked into and the earliest plans for a purpose-built London Headquarters date from 1906 for a site on Vauxhall Bridge Road.  In 1909, a site on Fulham Road was offered to the company.  Fulham Road, one of the main routes into London was considered a great location.  Later that same year, a piece of land bordered by Fulham Road, Sloane Avenue, Leader Street and Lucan Place was purchased freehold from Cadgan and Hans Estate Co.  Work on a design for the building had already begun and on 4 April 1910, the final designs for Michelin House were completed.  Shortly after, work began on the building's construction.

Technical aspects
Michelin House is known for its decorative design. What cannot be seen from its exterior or interior design is that it is an early example of concrete construction in Britain.

The building was constructed using Hennebique's ferro-concrete construction system.  The ferro-concrete system offered great benefits for the construction of clear open spaces (ideal for storing tyres in the most efficient way). It also offered fire resistance properties which were very important when storing large quantities of highly flammable tyres.

The system also had the advantage of quick construction; Michelin House took only 5 months to build. The original floors were constructed using hollow pot tiles. This flooring system as well as being highly durable also offered very good fireproofing qualities.

Other interesting original features in Michelin House were automatic doors into the entrance hall and a weighing bay in the fitting area which weighed customers' cars so the correct tyre pressure could be applied.

Architect
The architect behind Michelin House was François Espinasse (1880–1925), who was employed as an engineer in the construction department at Michelin's headquarters in Clermont-Ferrand. It is believed that he worked on the design of Michelin's Headquarters in Paris (1908), but this is the only other known architectural work of his. The French Order of Architects in Paris have no record of him. Not much else is known about him other than he spent most of his working life at Michelin.

Architectural style 

Michelin House is a unique building that is fine example of late Modern Style (British Art Nouveau style) and early Art Deco. It was designed and built at the end of the Art-Nouveau period; parts of this style can be seen in the decorative metal work at the front of the building above the fitting bays, and the tangling plants round the tyre motifs at the front and side of the building, and also in the mosaic in the entrance hall.  Despite this, Michelin House is very much like an Art-Deco building, the popular style of the 1930s with its prominent roadside position and its strong advertising images and symmetry.  In this respect, Michelin House is a building twenty years before its time and is also the first of the highly decorated buildings 'built on tyres', as Michelin House was built before Fort Dunlop (1916) and the Firestone Building (1928–1980).

Michelin House has been listed Grade II on the National Heritage List for England since April 1969.

Rise and fall
On 20 January 1911, Michelin House was officially opened.  The building offered everything the motorist of the time required.  Fitting bays at the front of the building allowed motorist to have their tyres speedily changed by Michelin fitters from the stock of over 30,000 stored in the basement.  Tyres were brought up on a lift and rolled to the front of the building along the purposely sloped floor.  To the left of the front recipient, a 'Touring Office' provided maps and writing implements for the keen motorist to plan his or her journey.

Within a year of opening, work started on an extension to the building to provide additional office space and included a second floor.  The extension was built along the Lucan Place side of the building.  A further extension was built in 1922, ten years after the first.  Located where a garage had stood, it reached three floors.

In 1927, Michelin built a factory in Stoke-on-Trent using the firm of Peter Lind & Company of London. The factory started producing the first British made Michelin tyres and in 1930, the company moved their head office to Stoke-on-Trent.  Michelin continued to use the basement and the ground floor of the building, but over two-thirds were left empty.  Between 1933 and 1940, the upper storeys were let as a furniture warehouse, a workshop and offices for the Air Ministry.

In 1940, because of the risk of bombing, Michelin removed the three stained glass windows.  They were carefully packed into wooden crates and sent to the Stoke-on-Trent factory for safe keeping.  After the war, Michelin returned its headquarters to London.  The reduced staff meant only the front, original part of the building was occupied, while the rest of the building was leased.  In 1950, a long term lease was signed by a new tenant for the space created in the 1912 and 1922 extensions.  In 1952, an extension was added for the tenant. A steel frame construction, it extended part of the second floor and added a third floor along the Lucan Place side of the building.

In 1960, Michelin and their tenant began a modernisation programme for the interior of the building.  The programme went along with the general taste of the time, dividing the open plan office and making much use of wood panelling.  Although the work concentrated on the interior of the building, updating the exterior of the building with a cement rendered facade was considered.

On 15 April 1969 the original front section of the Michelin Building was given a Grade II listing.  Despite this, outline planning permission was granted to demolish all but the listed part and build a ten-storey office block.  Michelin instead decided to spend the money on a new factory in North America.

Sale
In 1985, Michelin put the building up for sale. It was located in an expensive and fashionable part of London, but did not fit their office requirements.

Of the many people who made bids to buy Michelin House, the restaurateur and retailer Sir Terence Conran and Paul Hamlyn, owner of the Octopus Publishing Group, were friends who when they discovered they had been bidding against each other, formed a partnership to purchase it. In August 1985, it was sold to them for 8 million pounds.  Plans were then set into action to create a new lease of life for Michelin House.

Rebirth
Conran and Hamlyn set up Michelin House Developments to redevelop the building, to include a major retailing store, restaurant, bar and large office space. This was to be achieved by building a new steel and glass structure that would fill the space occupied by the side loading bay on the Sloane Avenue side, and by also adding a new neater front end to the third floor plus a new fourth floor and plant room above. Planning permission was granted and work began.

The chief contractor was Bovis, who worked on the shell and core.  Conran Roche worked on the interior of the new Conran Shop, and YRM worked on the interiors of the Octopus Publishing offices.

Conran Roche and YRM had to search for suppliers to recreate many of the building's original features.  The three stained glass windows which had been removed for safety during the Second World War had been lost and the glass cupolas at the front of the building had disappeared.  After a long search, suppliers were found, and replicas of the windows and cupolas were made using original drawings, photos and posters.

In August 1987, Michelin House re-opened.

In the late 1990s, Reed/Octopus Publishing moved out. In 1999, Monitor Group, an international business consulting firm, moved into the office space.

20 January 2011 marked the 100th anniversary of the building's opening. The event was celebrated by the building's then occupants, Bibendum Restaurant and The Conran Shop, and the former owner, Michelin.

As part of the centennial, Michelin has renewed its efforts to find the original stained glass windows. A stained glass amnesty website and hotline have been set up for this purpose.

References

External links

Bibendum Restaurant
The Conran Shop

1911 establishments in England
Art Nouveau architecture in London
Art Nouveau commercial buildings
Buildings and structures in the Royal Borough of Kensington and Chelsea
Michelin House
Commercial buildings completed in 1911
Grade II listed buildings in the Royal Borough of Kensington and Chelsea
Michelin
Restaurants in London
Tourist attractions in the Royal Borough of Kensington and Chelsea
Michelin Guide starred restaurants in the United Kingdom